Sketches is the 17th album by Scottish folk musician Bert Jansch, released virtually simultaneously with another album, The Ornament Tree.

Track listing
All tracks composed by Bert Jansch; except where indicated
 "Ring-A-Ding Bird" - 3:53
 "One For Jo" - 2:53
 "Poison" - 3:41
 "The Old Routine" - 3:22
 "Needle of Death" - 3:52
 "Oh My Father" - 3:13
 "Running, Running From Home" - 2:58
 "Afterwards" (Peter Kirtley) - 3:34
 "Can't Hide Love" - 3:53
 "Moonshine" - 3:32
 "A Woman Like You" - 3:44
 "A Windy Day" - 6:05
 "As The Day Grows Longer Now" - 2:18

Personnel
Bert Jansch - guitar, banjo, percussion, vocals
Peter Kirtley - guitar, percussion, backing vocals
Danny Thompson - bass, percussion
Steve Baker - harmonica
Stefan Wulff - percussion
Frank Wulff - alto flute, percussion, rainstick

References

Bert Jansch albums
1990 albums